Joseph Bipoba Naabu (born 24 August 1964) is a Ghanaian politician and member of the Seventh Parliament of the Fourth Republic of Ghana representing the Yunyoo Constituency in the Northern Region on the ticket of the National Democratic Congress.

Early life 
Naabu was born on 24 August 1964 in Namong, Northern Region of Ghana.

Education 
Naabu earned a bachelor of art degree in political science from the University of Ghana in 2006. He then went to Ghana School of Law to study Bachelor of law and later went to university of London to study Literally Legum Baccalaureus, 2009.

Career
Naabu is a farmer. He was the managing director of J.B. Naabu Farms and Company Limited prior to entering politics.

Politics
Naabu was elected to represent the Yunyoo constituency during the 2012 Ghanaian general election on the ticket of the National Democratic Congress. He was re-elected during the 2016 Ghanaian general election to hold office in that capacity for a second term.

Personal life
Naabi is married with four children. He identifies as a Christian and is a member of the Catholic Church.

References 

Ghanaian MPs 2017–2021
Living people
1964 births